Iron River Township is a civil township of Iron County in the U.S. state of Michigan. The population was 1,585 at the 2000 census.

Communities 
 The City of Iron River is situated at the southeast corner of the township, but is administratively autonomous.
 Beechwood is an unincorporated community in the township northwest of Iron River on US 2 at  Beechwood was named from a grove of beech trees near the town site. In 1888, Beechwood was made a stop on the Chicago and North Western Transportation Company. In November 1889, a post office was established with Richard M. Dwyer as the first postmaster. The post office was closed in January 1976.

Geography

Demographics
As of the census of 2000, there were 1,585 people, 596 households, and 401 families residing in the township.  The population density was 6.6 per square mile (2.6/km2).  There were 933 housing units at an average density of 3.9 per square mile (1.5/km2).  The racial makeup of the township was 90.85% White, 7.63% African American, 0.44% Native American, 0.13% Asian, 0.25% from other races, and 0.69% from two or more races. Hispanic or Latino of any race were 0.57% of the population. 16.1% were of German, 11.6% Italian, 10.3% Finnish, 9.9% Polish, 9.8% Swedish, 6.5% English and 6.3% French ancestry according to Census 2000.

There were 596 households, out of which 23.8% had children under the age of 18 living with them, 57.2% were married couples living together, 6.7% had a female householder with no husband present, and 32.6% were non-families. 28.9% of all households were made up of individuals, and 17.4% had someone living alone who was 65 years of age or older.  The average household size was 2.28 and the average family size was 2.78.

In the township the population was spread out, with 16.9% under the age of 18, 8.1% from 18 to 24, 31.4% from 25 to 44, 24.9% from 45 to 64, and 18.7% who were 65 years of age or older.  The median age was 41 years. For every 100 females, there were 131.7 males.  For every 100 females age 18 and over, there were 145.3 males.

The median income for a household in the township was $32,024, and the median income for a family was $39,643. Males had a median income of $29,803 versus $21,875 for females. The per capita income for the township was $14,679.  About 9.1% of families and 12.8% of the population were below the poverty line, including 17.3% of those under age 18 and 10.3% of those age 65 or over.

References

Townships in Iron County, Michigan
Townships in Michigan